The 2019–20 season was MTK Budapest FC's 118th competitive season, 1st consecutive season in the OTP Bank Liga and 132nd year in existence as a football club.

Transfers

Summer

In:

Out:

Source:

Winter

In:

Out:

Nemzeti Bajnokság I

League table

Results summary

Results by round

Matches

Hungarian Cup

Statistics

Appearances and goals
Last updated on 15 May 2021.

|-
|colspan="14"|Youth players:

|-
|colspan="14"|Players no longer at the club:

|}

Top scorers
Includes all competitive matches. The list is sorted by shirt number when total goals are equal.
Last updated on 15 May 2021

Disciplinary record
Includes all competitive matches. Players with 1 card or more included only.

Last updated on 15 May 2021

Overall
{|class="wikitable"
|-
|Games played || 39 (33 OTP Bank Liga and 6 Hungarian Cup)
|-
|Games won || 16 (11 OTP Bank Liga and 5 Hungarian Cup)
|-
|Games drawn || 9 (9 OTP Bank Liga and 0 Hungarian Cup)
|-
|Games lost || 14 (13 OTP Bank Liga and 1 Hungarian Cup)
|-
|Goals scored || 70
|-
|Goals conceded || 55
|-
|Goal difference || +15
|-
|Yellow cards || 84
|-
|Red cards || 3
|-
|rowspan="1"|Worst discipline ||  Sebastián Herrera (11 , 1 )
|-
|rowspan="1"|Best result || 8–0 (A) v 43.Sz.Építők - Hungarian Cup - 19-9-2020
|-
|rowspan="2"|Worst result || 0–4 (A) v Paks - Nemzeti Bajnokság I - 26-9-2020
|-
| 1–5 (A) v Mezőkövesd - Nemzeti Bajnokság I - 7-5-2021
|-
|rowspan="1"|Most appearances ||  Dániel Prosser (34 appearances)
|-
|rowspan="2"|Top scorer ||  Szabolcs Schön (11 goals)
|-
|  Roland Varga (11 goals)
|-
|Points || 57/117 (48.71%)
|-

References

External links
 Official Website
 fixtures and results
 History and others

2020-21
Mtk Budapest